Gjorgi Gjorgiev (born 22 May 1992) is a Macedonian professional volleyball player, a member of the North Macedonia national team. He participated at the 2019 European Championship. At the professional club level, he plays for Cambrai Volley.

Career

National team
In 2015, Macedonia, including Gjorgiev, met with Slovenia in the final of the 2015 European League and achieved silver medal. One year later his national team also made it to the final but was beaten by Estonia.

Honours

Clubs
 National championships
 2012/2013  Bulgarian Cup, with Marek Union-Ivkoni
 2012/2013  Bulgarian Championship, with Marek Union-Ivkoni
 2013/2014  Bulgarian Championship, with Marek Union-Ivkoni
 2014/2015  Bulgarian Championship, with Marek Union-Ivkoni
 2021/2022  Bulgarian SuperCup, with Hebar Pazardzhik
 2021/2022  Bulgarian Cup, with Hebar Pazardzhik
 2021/2022  Bulgarian Championship, with Hebar Pazardzhik

References

External links

 
 Player profile at PlusLiga.pl 
 Player profile at Volleybox.net

1992 births
Living people
Sportspeople from Strumica
Macedonian men's volleyball players
Macedonian expatriate sportspeople in Turkey
Expatriate volleyball players in Turkey
Macedonian expatriate sportspeople in France
Expatriate volleyball players in France
Macedonian expatriate sportspeople in Poland
Expatriate volleyball players in Poland
Macedonian expatriate sportspeople in Bulgaria
Paris Volley players
Warta Zawiercie players
Setters (volleyball)